Ulrike Maier (22 October 1967 – 29 January 1994) was a World Cup alpine ski racer from Austria, a two-time World Champion in Super-G. She competed at the 1988 Winter Olympics and the 1992 Winter Olympics.

Born in Rauris, Salzburg, where her father ran a ski school, Maier won the Super-G gold medal at the World Championships in both 1989 and 1991. She also took home the giant slalom silver medal in the 1991 event. Her first of five World Cup wins came in November 1992 and she attained 21 podiums and 59 top ten finishes in her World Cup career.

Accident
Two weeks prior to the 1994 Winter Olympics, the women's World Cup was in Garmisch-Partenkirchen, Germany, in late January. The downhill on the classic Kandahar course at Garmisch Classic was held on Saturday, 29 January, following an overnight snowfall.

She died of her injuries shortly after being evacuated to the hospital in nearby Murnau. At the age of 26, she had considered retirement at the end of the 1994 season, due to a dip in form that resulted in disappointing performances at the 1992 Olympic Games in France and the 1993 World Championships in Japan. However, she had bounced back by winning two giant slaloms during the 1994 season and claiming podium finishes in the two Super Gs of Cortina. Following these results, she was reconsidering her decision in the days before the fateful downhill run, planning to continue until the 1995 World Championships in Spain.

Unlike most other fatal skiing accidents, her crash happened during a live television broadcast. Maier was survived by her daughter Melanie (b. 1989) and was buried in her home village of Rauris, where thousands attended her funeral. Teammate and close friend Anita Wachter wore Maier's world championship medals in the procession.

Initially it was claimed that her death was caused by hitting a wooden timing post. Based on that claim, Maier's fiancé Hubert Schweighhofer criticized the organizers of the race and filed suit against them. However, several months later the court found that Maier actually did not hit the timing post with her head, but probably broke her neck by crashing into a pile of snow on the border of the race course. The court did not find any negligence from the organizers and dismissed the suit. Manslaughter charges against two FIS race officials were dropped after a settlement was reached in 1996.

World Cup results

Season standings

Race podiums
5 wins: (2 SG, 3 GS)
21 podiums: (8 SG, 10 GS, 1 SL, 1 PS, 1 K)

World Championship results

Olympic results

References

External links

Ulrike Maier World Cup standings at the International Ski Federation

1967 births
1994 deaths
People from Zell am See District
Austrian female alpine skiers
Filmed deaths in sports
Skiing deaths
Sport deaths in Germany
Olympic alpine skiers of Austria
Alpine skiers at the 1988 Winter Olympics
Alpine skiers at the 1992 Winter Olympics
Sportspeople from Salzburg (state)
20th-century Austrian women